Betta obscura (obscura meaning "dark in color") is a species of gourami that occurs in the Barito basin in Kalimantan Tengah, Indonesia. This species is a mouthbrooder, and grows to a length of around  SL.

References

obscura
Fish described in 2004